Al Bakrah is a sub-district located in al-Radmah District, Ibb Governorate, Yemen. Al Bakrah  had a population of 6338 according to the 2004 census.

References 

Sub-districts in Ar Radmah District